The 2006 international cricket season started with controversial ICC members Zimbabwe touring the West Indies for a series of seven One Day International matches. Because Zimbabwe recently pulled out of playing Test matches, the tour had to be rescheduled which meant the two Test matches were turned into limited overs games, bumping them up from the original five. After Zimbabwe's decision to leave Test cricket at the start of 2006, the West Indies Cricket Board had reconsidered the tour, but without any other team to play they had to appease both sponsors and fans. Although the teams lie next to each other in the ICC ODI Championship, West Indies holds 89 points in eighth place, 47 more than the tourists' 42 in ninth.

Schedule

Squads

One-Day Matches

First ODI (29 April)

Brian Lara's first match in his third spell as captain ended in victory, as Zimbabwe mustered 151 in their 50 overs, and four West Indian bowlers got two wickets each. Despite Runako Morton recording a duck, West Indies made it to the target with five wickets and 11.4 overs to spare, as Lara top scored with 40, the second highest total of the match. However, according to Cricinfo reporter Will Luke, West Indies "rarely looked in complete control". For Zimbabwe, Blessing Mahwire bowled seven overs and conceded 14 runs with six wides, while Prosper Utseya picked up a career best three for 35. In the first innings, Justice Chibhabha hit a half-century in his second ODI.

Second ODI (30 April)

Despite another half-century from Justice Chibhabha, this time worth 12 runs more than in the first ODI, Zimbabwe's total of 144 was seven lower than in the first ODI. West Indies had batted first, making 242 for 9 after Chris Gayle, Ramnaresh Sarwan and Shivnarine Chanderpaul all passed 40, while five Zimbabwean bowlers got at least one wicket each. Jerome Taylor then took four wickets as Zimbabwe fell for 144, with Elton Chigumbura (13) and Tawanda Mupariwa (16) joining Chibhabha with double figure scores.

Tour Match: Zimbabwe v University of West Indies Vice Chancellor's XI (3 May)
University of West Indies Vice Chancellor's XI won by 5 wickets

Piet Rinke hit 113 for the Zimbabweans in the 13-a-side match, and Brendan Taylor and Charles Coventry also took half-centuries. For the University of West Indies' XI, Ryan Hinds and Xavier Marshall, who had both played internationals for West Indies before, made scores of 117 not out and 54 respectively, and C. Walton anchored the chase with 67 as the hosts won with 23 balls to spare.

Third ODI (6 May)

Fourth ODI (7 May)

West Indies sealed at least a draw in the series after a convincing 82-run victory over Zimbabwe in Georgetown. The West Indies handed a debut to 25-year-old opener Sewnarine Chattergoon but he disappointed in front of his home crowd scoring only 9. But a few players did play a part in the massive total of 333/6 set by the West Indies. Shivnarine Chanderpaul top scored with 93 off 82 balls (7 fours & 4 sixes), and there were also half-centuries from Runako Morton (79 off 90) and captain Brian Lara (56 off 45). This set Zimbabwe an unlikely 334 target, and sure enough struggled. Fidel Edwards bowled Piet Rinke with the first ball of the innings, and also took the scalp of Zimbabwean captain Terry Duffin with the 4th ball of that over, leaving Zimbabwe at one run for two wickets, but steady knocks from Justice Chibhabha, Vusi Sibanda and Elton Chigumbura got the Zimbabweans past 100. But they weren't scoring quickly enough, and after their allotted 50 overs, came up 82 runs short, with Edwards the pick of the bowlers.  This was also the last international match at the Bourda ground:

Fifth ODI (10 May)

Sixth ODI (13 May)

Seventh ODI (14 May)

Notes

External sources
 CricketArchive – itinerary of events

Further reading
 Wisden Cricketers' Almanack

2006 in West Indian cricket
International cricket competitions in 2006
West Indian cricket seasons from 2000–01
2006
2006 in Zimbabwean cricket